A presidio was a fortified base established by the Spanish Empire around between 16th and 18th centuries in areas in condition of their control or influence. The presidios of Spanish Philippines in particular, were centers where the martial art of Arnis de Mano was developed from Spanish cut-and-thrust fencing style.
The term is derived from the Latin word praesidium meaning protection or defense.

In the Mediterranean and the Philippines, the presidios were outposts of Christian defense against Islamic raids. In the Americas, the fortresses were built to protect against raid of pirates, rival colonists, as well as Native Americans. 

Later in western North America, with independence, the Mexicans garrisoned the Spanish presidios on the northern frontier and followed the same pattern in unsettled frontier regions such as the Presidio de Sonoma, at Sonoma, California, and the Presidio de Calabasas, in Arizona.

In western North America, a rancho del rey or kings ranch would be established a short distance outside a presidio. This was a tract of land assigned to the presidio to furnish pasturage to the horses and other beasts of burden of the garrison.  Mexico called this facility "rancho nacional".
Presidios were only accessible to Spanish military and soldiers.

North Africa

After the Granada War and the completion of the Spanish Reconquista, the Catholic Monarchs took their fight across the Strait of Gibraltar, as the Portuguese had done several generations earlier with the conquest of Ceuta in 1415. The establishment of Spanish military outposts on the North African coast echoed earlier endeavors by the Kingdom of Sicily in the 12th century (and again in Djerba under Frederick III of Sicily) and the Kingdom of France in the 13th century (Eighth Crusade of 1270). During the period of Iberian Union between 1580 and 1640, the Spanish Crown gained Ceuta and the Portuguese outposts on the Atlantic Coast, such as Tangier, Mazagão/El Jadida and Casablanca; but of these, it only retained Ceuta by the Treaty of Lisbon (1668). 

The Spanish North African presidios are listed here in geographical sequence, from West to East, and including neither Spain's Atlantic settlements in the Moroccan far South (e.g. Santa Cruz de la Mar Pequeña) nor outposts gained after 1830 (e.g. the Chafarinas Islands). 

Mehdya, Morocco (La Mamora or San Miguel de Ultramar), 1614–1681
Larache, 1610–1689
Ceuta, acquired from Portugal in 1668
Peñón de Vélez de la Gomera, 1508–1522 and since 1564
Alhucemas Islands, since 1559
Cazaza, 1505–1533
Melilla, since 1497
Honaine, briefly in 1534
Mers El Kébir (Mazalquivir), 1505–1708 and 1732–1792
Oran, 1509–1708 and 1732–1792
Algiers (Argel), 1510–1516; Peñón islet until 1529
Béjaïa (Bugia), 1510–1555
Annaba (Bona), 1535–1540
Bizerte (Bizerta), 1535–1574
La Goulette (La Goleta), 1535–1574
Tunis (Túnez), 1573–1574 (protectorate from 1535 to 1569)
Sousse (Susa), 1537–1574
Monastir, 1550–1554
Mahdia (Mahdía), 1550–1553
Djerba (Yerba), 1521–1523 and 1551–1560
Tripoli (Trípoli), 1510–1530 then granted to the Knights Hospitaller who held it until 1551

Italy

Several fortresses formerly held by the Republic of Siena were acquired by Spain following the latter's demise, by treaty between Philip II of Spain and Cosimo I de' Medici, Grand Duke of Tuscany on 3 July 1557, to form what became known as the Estado de los Presidios. They were held by Spain until the War of the Spanish Succession, when they came under Austrian ownership, and were administered from Naples. 

Porto Ercole
Porto Santo Stefano
Orbetello
Talamone
Ansedonia
Giannutri
Porto Azzurro

Philippines

Luzon
The Presidio de Santiago, founded in 1593 in Intramuros, Manila
The Presidio de San Felipe (Cavite), founded in 1609 in San Roque, Cavite

Visayas
The Presidio de Lawis in Madridejos, Cebu, the current structure is the oldest in the country laid down around 1628–1630
The Presidio (Fort) de San Pedro (Iloilo), founded in 1616 in Iloilo City
The Presidio de San Pedro (Cebu), founded in 1630 in Cebu

Mindanao
The Presidio de Nuestra Señora del Pilar de Zaragoza, founded in 1635 in Zamboanga

Mexico

Few presidios were established in the present-day desert frontier regions in northern Mexico to control and confine the existing rebellious indigenous tribes. Captured indigenous warriors were confined and enslaved at the presidio.

Baja California Sur
 The Real Presidio de Loreto, founded in 1697 in Loreto, Baja California Sur.

Nuevo León
The Presidio San Gregorio de Cerralvo, founded in 1626 in Cerralvo.

Sonora
The Presidio del Pitic, founded in 1726 in Hermosillo, Sonora
The Presidio Santa Gertrudis del Altar, founded in 1755 in Altar, Sonora
The Presidio de Santa Rosa de Corodéguachi, founded in 1692, near the Sonora/Arizona border and later moved to Fronteras, Sonora

Durango
 The Presidio de Santa Catalina de Tepehuanes (1620 – 1690s?), in Santa Catarina de Tepehuanes.
 The Presidio del Pasaje (1685), on Rio Nazas northwest of Cuencamé.
 The Presidio de San Pedro del Gallo (1690s), in San Pedro del Gallo.
 The Presidio de Santiago de Mapimí (1715), in Mapimí.
 The Presidio de San Miguel de Cerrogordo (1648–1767) in Villa Hidalgo.

Chihuahua
The Presidio de El Paso del Río Grande del Norte (1683–1773), at Ciudad Juárez, across the river from El Paso, Texas.  Later relocated south in 1773  to Carrizal.
The Presidio de San Felipe y Santiago de Janos (1691-?), in Janos. 
The Presidio de Casas Grandes (1686), was relocated to Janos in 1691.
The Presidio de San Francisco de Conchos, founded in 1685 at San Francisco de Conchos.
The Presidio de San Bartolomé (? – 1710), located 20 km east of Parral. Replaced by flying squadron operating from the Post of Valle de San Bartolomé (1710 – ?).
The Presidio de San Carlos de Cerro Gordo, founded in 1772 at Manuel Benavides.
The Presidio de Nuestra Señora de las Caldas de Guajoquilla, founded in 1752 in Jiménez
 The Presidio de San Fernando de Carrizal (1758 – ?)

Coahuila
The Presidio del Santísimo Sacramento del Valle de Santa Rosa, founded in 1780 in Santa Rosa de Múzquiz
The Presidio San Juan Bautista del Río Grande, founded around 1703 in San Juan Bautista, now the present-day Guerrero, Coahuila
The Presidio San Antonio Bucareli de la Babia, founded in 1774 in Cuatro Ciénegas

United States

South Carolina

 The Presidio Santa Elena, founded in 1566 on Parris Island, destroyed by Native Americans in 1576, re-established in 1577, abandoned in 1587

Georgia

 The Presidio Guale, founded in 1566, abandoned three months later
 The Presidio San Pedro de Tacatacuru, founded in 1569 on Cumberland Island, abandoned in 1573

Florida

 The Presidio San Augustin, founded in 1565, which developed into the city of St. Augustine, ceded to Great Britain in 1763, regained 20 years later, and transferred to the United States in 1821
 The Presidio San Mateo, founded in 1565 on the ruins of Fort Caroline, captured and destroyed by the French in 1568
 The Presidio Ais, founded in 1565 on the Indian River Lagoon, abandoned after one month
 The Presidio Santa Lucia, founded in 1565 near Cape Canaveral, abandoned four months later
 The Presidio San Antonio de Padua, founded in 1566 at Calos, capital of the Calusa, abandoned in 1569
 The Presidio Tocobaga, founded in 1567 on Tampa Bay, destroyed by the Tocobagas within ten months
 The Presidio Tequesta, founded in 1567 on the site of what is now Miami, abandoned in 1568
 The Presidio Santa Maria de Galve, founded in 1696, near Fort Barrancas at present-day Naval Air Station Pensacola; captured by French in 1719, Spanish relocated to Presidio Bahía San José de Nueva Asturias (see below)
 The Presidio Bahía San José de Valladares, founded in 1701 on St. Joseph Bay, captured by French in 1718
 The Presidio San Marcos de Apalachee, founded in 1718 at the existing port of San Marcos, which developed into the town of St. Marks, ceded to Great Britain in 1763, regained 20 years later, and transferred to the United States in 1821
 The Presidio Bahía San José de Nueva Asturias, founded in 1719 on St. Joseph Point, abandoned when Spanish regained Pensacola Bay area from French in 1722, Spanish relocated to Presidio Isla Santa Rosa Punta de Siguenza (see below) 
 The Presidio Isla Santa Rosa Punta de Siguenza, founded in 1722 on Santa Rosa Island, destroyed by a hurricane in 1755, Spanish relocated to Presidio San Miguel de Panzacola (see below)
 The Presidio San Miguel de Panzacola, founded in 1755, which developed into the city of Pensacola, ceded to Great Britain in 1763, regained 20 years later, and transferred to the United States in 1821

Louisiana

The Presidio Nuestra Señora del Pilar de los Adaes, founded in 1721 near the present-day Robeline

Texas

The Presidio Fuerte de Santa Cruz del Cibolo, founded in 1734 and re-established in 1771 near Cestohowa, Texas in Karnes County, Texas, (between San Antonio and Goliad).
The Presidio San Antonio de Béxar, founded in 1718 in San Antonio
The Presidio Nuestra Señora de Loreto, founded in 1721, near Lavaca Bay, now in Goliad
The Presidio San Luis de las Amarillas San Saba, founded in 1772 near the present-day Menard
The Presidio de la Junta de los Ríos Norte y Conchos, founded in 1760 just southwest of present-day Presidio

New Mexico

The Presidio Santa Cruz de la Cañada, in Santa Cruz

Arizona

 The Presidio San Ignacio de Tubac, founded in 1752 in Tubac
 The Presidio San Augustin del Tucson, founded in 1775 in Tucson
 The Presidio Santa Cruz de Terrenate, founded in 1775 near the present-day Tombstone
 The Presidio de Calabasas, founded in 1837 near the present-day Tumacacori
 The Presidio de San Bernardino, founded in 1776 near the present-day Douglas (Gerald 1968)

California

 The Presidio Real de San Carlos de Monterey, founded in 1770. Its rancho del rey was what became Rancho Nacional. It is currently housing the Defense Language Institute, in Monterey
 The Presidio Real de San Diego, founded in 1769 in San Diego, its rancho del rey was what became Rancho de la Nación.
 The Presidio Real de San Francisco, founded in 1776 and now part of the Golden Gate National Recreation Area in San Francisco. Its rancho del rey was what became Rancho Buri Buri.
 The Presidio Real de Santa Bárbara, founded in 1782 in Santa Barbara.  Its rancho del rey was what became Rancho San Julian. 
 The Presidio de Sonoma, founded by Mexico in 1836 in Sonoma.  Its rancho nacional was what became Rancho Suscol.

Canada

Fort San Miguel

Chile

Notes

References and further reading
Gerald, Rex E. (1968). Spanish Presidios of the Late Eighteenth Century in Northern New Spain. Museum of New Mexico Press, Santa Fe.
Moorhead, Max L. The Presidio: Bastion of the Spanish Borderlands. Norman: University of Oklahoma Press 1975.
Rene Javellana, S. J. Fortress of Empire. Ateneo de Manila University Press 1997.

Architecture in Spain
Spanish forts in the United States